The Cobbham Historic District, in Athens, Georgia, is a historic district which was listed on the National Register of Historic Places in 1978.

The district is roughly bounded by Prince Ave., Hill, Reese, and Pope Streets.  It includes Greek Revival, Gothic Revival, and Late Victorian.

It includes:
Fire Station #2
James A. Sledge House, a Gothic Revival cottage which is separately listed on the National Register.
Seney-Stovall Chapel, separately listed

References

National Register of Historic Places in Clarke County, Georgia
Historic districts on the National Register of Historic Places in Georgia (U.S. state)
Greek Revival architecture in Georgia (U.S. state)
Gothic Revival architecture in Georgia (U.S. state)
Victorian architecture in Georgia (U.S. state)
Buildings and structures completed in 1834